The 1950 Washington Senators won 67 games, lost 87, and finished in fifth place in the American League. They were managed by Bucky Harris and played home games at Griffith Stadium.

Offseason 
 November 17, 1949: Steve Nagy was drafted by the Senators from the San Francisco Seals in the 1949 rule 5 draft.
 Prior to 1950 season: Al Sima was purchased by the Senators from the New York Giants.

Regular season

Season standings

Record vs. opponents

Opening Day lineup

Notable transactions 
 June 14, 1950: Dick Weik was traded by the Senators to the Cleveland Indians for Mickey Vernon.
 June 25, 1950: Steve Nagy was traded by the Senators to the San Francisco Seals for Elmer Singleton.

Roster

Player stats

Batting

Starters by position 
Note: Pos = Position; G = Games played; AB = At bats; H = Hits; Avg. = Batting average; HR = Home runs; RBI = Runs batted in

Other batters 
Note: G = Games played; AB = At bats; H = Hits; Avg. = Batting average; HR = Home runs; RBI = Runs batted in

Pitching

Starting pitchers 
Note: G = Games pitched; IP = Innings pitched; W = Wins; L = Losses; ERA = Earned run average; SO = Strikeouts

Other pitchers 
Note: G = Games pitched; IP = Innings pitched; W = Wins; L = Losses; ERA = Earned run average; SO = Strikeouts

Relief pitchers 
Note: G = Games pitched; W = Wins; L = Losses; SV = Saves; ERA = Earned run average; SO = Strikeouts

Farm system 

LEAGUE CHAMPIONS: Emporia

References

External links
1950 Washington Senators at Baseball-Reference
1950 Washington Senators team page at www.baseball-almanac.com

Minnesota Twins seasons
Washington Senators season
Washing